The Sarajevo–Ploče railway is a  long railway in Bosnia and Herzegovina and Croatia. The line connects Sarajevo with Konjic, Mostar and Ploče. The route operates through the regions of Sarajevo Canton, Herzegovina-Neretva Canton and Dubrovnik-Neretva County. The route largely follows the route of the Neretva river. Passenger services along the full length of line have been discontinued between 2013 and 2022, running only between Sarajevo and the town of Čapljina on the Bosnian-Croatian border. International train service between Sarajevo and Ploče resumed on 1 July 2022, on weekends until September 1st, using Spanish-designed Talgo wagons. The line is part of the pan-European corridor 5C from Budapest via Osijek and Sarajevo to Ploče. The section through Bosnia and Herzegovina is marked 11, and through Croatia M304.

Route 

The railway starts at the Sarajevo station, goes through the Sarajevo field, and has the characteristics of a plain railway. The valley of the river Zujevina acquires the characteristics of a slope and descends through the Ivan mountain to the Bradina high-slope railway. The descent of the railway continues on the left side of the Trešanica river to Podorašac, where it crosses to the right side of the Trešanica river to Konjice. The route continues across the Jablanica lake, and after Ostrošac, it descends towards the Neretva with features of a slope railway. Before Jablanica, it crosses to the right side of the Neretva. The railway continues through the Neretva canyon between the Prenj and Čvrsnica mountains, and after Raštan, it again crosses to the left side of the Neretva and enters Mostar. Leaving Mostar, the line heads south, again crosses to the right side of the Neretva to Ploče with the features of the low valley railway before ending on the coast of the Adractic sea.

Railway features

Technical data about the current broad gauge railway:
 Length: 194.6 km
 Track: 1
 Stations: 27
 Bridges: 71 with a total length of 
 of the above data, 46 tunnels and 21 bridges are on the section between Bradina and Konjic
 Minimum radius on the most difficult sections: 250 m (between Grad and Konjic stations)
 Minimum radius on other sections: 
 Track development coefficient: 1.63
 Expected speeds (according to the project):  (minimum)  (maximum)
 Axle pressure: 20 t
 Electrical voltage networks: 25 kV, 50 Hz.

Stations
 Sarajevo
 Konjic
 Čelebić
 Ostrožac
 Mostar
 Ploče

History

The planning and building
After the Berlin Congress in 1878, Bosnia and Herzegovina came under the military administration of Austria-Hungary. This change in circumstances allowed the development of what had been a policy of isolating Dalmatian ports from inland access to be reversed and the construction of a railway network in the newly acquired areas to be accelerated. Military and strategic interests had priority in determining future routes over economic interests. Over the next several decades, a network of narrow-gauge railways throughout Bosnia and Herzegovina where built, with a gauge width of 760 mm, often called the Bosnian gauge, were created. In the period from 1879 to 1891, several railways were connected on the route Bosanski Brod-Zenica-Sarajevo-Mostar-Metković. After the construction of the railway Bosanski Brod-Sarajevo, the plan was to build the railway from Sarajevo-Banja Luka via Travnik and Jajce, and further towards Aržano and Split (Sinjska rera), as well as the Una railway. The Hungarians opposed that plan, believing that the Austrian part of the Monarchy would benefit more from that railway. At that time, the plan for the construction of the Sarajevo-Metković railway was adopted, although it was not the best solution in the long run due to the shallow and muddy Neretva and the impossibility of docking larger vessels in the port of Metković.

The first measurements began in 1879, and in the summer of 1884, the construction of the first section from Metković to Mostar began, for which all the material was brought via the port in Metković. From Gabela to Metković, due to the flooding of the Neretva, the railway was built on an embankment. The capacity of the section was 30 trains in 24 hours, and the maximum speed was up to 18 km/h.

The line opens

The line was opened in 1891 in the Bosnian gauge of 760mm. With the construction of the railway, the port of Metković grew into one of the most important ports in Dalmatia, and the first port in Dalmatia to receive a railway line. The section from Mostar to Konjic was built through the canyon of the Neretva river, and in some places, it had features of a mountain railway. A lot of walls, tunnels and cuttings were built, and because of the frequent crossing from one side of the river to the other, there were also a lot of bridges, so that section was much more expensive than the section built before. For this purpose, a third rail (the so-called cogwheel of engineer Roman Abt) was laid on two sections: Pazarić - Tarčin (3,722 km, incline 35 per thousand) and Podorašac - Raštelica (15,222 km, gradient 60 per thousand). With the construction of the railway, the port in Metković has grown into one of the most important ports in Dalmatia, and the first port in Dalmatia to receive a railway. A tunnel with a length of 648 m was also cut through the Ivan mountains. Special steam locomotives of the 97 series performed the pulling of trains on these two sections.

 Metković - Mostar, 43,678 km, put into traffic on 14 May 1885.
 Mostar - Ostrožac, 65,315 km, put into traffic on 22 August 1888.
 Ostrožac – Konjic, 13,030 km, put into traffic on 10 November 1889.
 Konjic - Sarajevo, 55,432 km, put into traffic on 1 August 1891.

In addition to the port in Metković, with the subsequent construction and commissioning of the Gabela - Zelenika railway line, Bosnia was also connected to the port in Gruž.

With the subsequent change of the route from Raštelica to Pazarić (complete abolition of the cogwheel on that section) and the construction of a new tunnel through Ivan planina with a length of 3223 m between the two world wars, the cogwheel was partially abolished on 9 April 1931. Trains are used by additional locomotives in the so-called pushing or harnessing. Despite the subsequent works, the section was the bottleneck of the entire railway and limited the capacity to 1,000,000 net tons per year, and like most railways built at the time in BiH, this entire railway was built well below the standards for railways of this type.

Continuation to Ploče

Although there was an idea of ​​extending the railway to the mouth of the Neretva, it became relevant in the 1920s as part of the project to connect Belgrade via Sarajevo with a new port on the sea, considering that the port in Metković could not meet the growing needs. There were suggestions that the port should be in Klek or Neum, and the ports in Split and Dubrovnik were also against the new port. At the initiative of the Sarajevo Chamber of Commerce and Crafts, the Association of Engineers and Architects in late 1922 and early 1923 carried out the first measurements and surveys of the terrain at the site of the future port in Ploče and at the railway conference held in 1926, it was decided that the future port would be in Ploče. However, construction was constantly delayed due to conflicting interests regarding the future port. The technical study was completed only in 1936, after the acceptance of the port project in Ploče in 1938, when work began on the entire route to Ploče. The entire section had five stations, four bridges and five tunnels. By the end of 1940, there were almost 80% earthworks on the embankments, five tunnels, twenty-seven buildings, and other structures. With the Germany and Italy attack on Yugoslavia, all works are suspended. In 1942, Italy completed the construction of the railway, and after its capitulation, Germany rebuilt the partially damaged railway. At the end of the Second World War, the railway damaged by the withdrawal of Germany was being rebuilt again, and on 15 July 1945, the entire length from the port in Ploče to Sarajevo was put into traffic.

Postwar modernization

One of the necessary conditions for the industrialization of the SFRY after the Second World War was the reconstruction of 80% of the railway network destroyed or disabled in the war the modernization and transition to a normal gauge (1435 mm), in order to increase rail capacity. In Bosnia and Herzegovina, new or modernized existing railways were built: Brčko - Banovići, Vrpolje - Šamac - Sarajevo, Doboj - Banja Luka and others. It was also necessary to modernize the Sarajevo–Ploče railway, considering that the port in Ploče was the most favourable outlet for BiH industry to the Adriatic Sea. The biggest problem was solving the most difficult section of the railway over Ivan mountain. Research works and studies lasted from 1948 to 1958, during which time 13 possible solutions were analyzed. The adopted solution provided for the maximum use of the existing tunnel through Ivan mountain and the settlements and industries along the existing narrow-gauge railway. The five-year plan established that the railway should be built by the end of 1962.

Work on the railway began in 1958, but due to a lack of financial resources, the intensity was limited on the Bradina - Konjic section. They only intensified in 1961, and in 1964, work was completed on the entire length of the line.

The construction took place in three stages:
 building construction capacities and a smaller number of tracks
 electrification and construction of electrical relay security of stations
 remote traffic control, automatic track block, and completion of tracks in stations.

The last train of the narrow-gauge railway left Ploče on 5 November 1966. The correspondent of Slobodna Dalmacija wrote on that occasion:

Parts of the original line were flooded by the creation of a number of Hydroelectric dams along the river. The standard gauge line was officially opened on 26 and 27 November 1966. The new railway was put into traffic on 1 December 1966, and traction was initially performed by diesel locomotives because the railway was in the first stage of construction. The electrification of the railway and the electrical relay protection of the stations was completed and put into operation in May 1969. The final completion of the works on the railway was in 1972, with the completion of the remote traffic control system and power plants for powering the catenary network. The final price of the works on the railway amounted to 1,149.4 million dinars. Together with the Vrpolje-Sarajevo line, this line made up 24% of the railway network in Bosnia and Herzegovina at the time (the total length of both lines was 450.5 km), and 60% of the work and 65% of the revenue of ŽTP Sarajevo, and at that time it was the most modern railway of the then state.

Modernization Effects

With the electrification of the railway, goods traffic recorded constant growth. So in Ploče railway station in 1969, the turnover of goods amounted to 1.03 million tons. Already in 1971, the turnover doubled (2.09 million tons), reaching 2.86 million tons in 1977 and 3.61 million tons in 1987. At the same time, passenger traffic was declining: 482,000 passengers departed from the Ploče railway station in 1969, 384,000 in 1971, 296,000 in 1977, and 173,000 in 1987.

Due to the integration of the Port of Ploče and ŽTP Sarajevo in 1969, work began expanding the port's capacity in Ploče. The increase in the volume of freight traffic on the railway was accompanied by the increase in traffic in the port of Ploče. Thus, traffic in the port increased from 1.1 million tons in 1969 to 2.3 million tons in 1971, when an oil-receiving facility with a capacity of 1.5 million tons per year was built. The increase in the capacity of the port in Ploče continued with the construction of a terminal for the transport of live livestock, wood, grain, and alumina, so the port in Ploče acquired the conditions for transit cargo from Central European countries. Already in 1977, the traffic of the port amounted to 2.95 million tons, and thanks to the development of large companies in Bosnia and Herzegovina (Željezara Zenica, KHK Lukavac, Aluminij Mostar,...) was constantly increasing, so in 1987 it exceeded the amount of 4.5 million tons.

Breakup of Yugoslavia

With the independence of Croatia in 1991, the Croatian section of the line was transferred to the newly formed railway company Hrvatske željeznice (HŽ), while the remaining section north of Metković remained with in Bosnia and Herzegovina (then still a consituant republic of SFRY). This section was transferred to Željeznice Federacije Bosne i Hercegovine (ŽFBH) in 1993 following BiH declaration of independence. On the eve of the war itself, in 1992, a large part of the railway infrastructure in BiH was modernized, the tracks were overhauled, as well as the rolling stock and traction vehicles were modernized. The war in Bosnia and Herzegovina led to the suspension of traffic on most railway lines. Although on a much smaller scale than before the war, traffic on part of this railway was also carried out during the war, namely on the section Ploče - Čapljina and Mostar-Baćevići and later (with the establishment of Željeznice Herceg Bosne) also from the suburbs of Mostar to Čapljina. According to data from Željeznice FBiH, war damage to facilities and infrastructure in BiH amounted to about 854 million US dollars. The port in Ploče also suffered indirect war damage, which during the war operated at 5-10% of its capacity, and the pre-war volume of traffic was overtaken only in 2008 (5.1 million tons).

Current status

Today, three railway operators operate the line. In the territory of BiH, Željeznice FBiH operates (including the Čapljina station), and further in the territory of Croatia, HŽ Cargo and Enna Transport operate. Since 2010 passenger service uses Talgo trains. After its cancellation in December 2013, again, after almost 9 years, the passenger train connected Sarajevo and Ploče. According to the data from the State Bureau of Statistics, in 2012, traffic of 1,118,962 tons (loading 788,674 t, unloading 329,288 t) was recorded at the railway station in Ploče. The number of passengers travelled was 7,935, which are significantly lower value compared to the market before the War in Croatian . The line was closed from 2015-2017 for repairs and upgrades. Passenger service did not extend into Croatia; the final distance from Čapljina at the border to Ploče, where a rail replacement bus service was in operation. Nonetheless, during the summer of 2022, the Talgo service from Sarajevo was extended to the Croatian coastal town of Ploče during the weekends. Starting from 1 July 2022. until 11 September 2022. the train runs three times a week, on Fridays, Saturdays and Sundays.

In 2018 The Guardian named the line "among the most beautiful in the world" among the 18 countries in the world where you can best experience the adventure of travelling by train.

Usage
The line is used by the following services:

Sarajevo - Konjic - Mostar - Čapljina Brzi voz (Talgo)
Sarajevo - Konjic Lokalni voz
Metković - Ploče

Gallery

Further reading
Sarajevo - Ploče Railway, Institute for Newspaper-Publishing and Propaganda Activity JŽ, Belgrade
One hundred years of railways in Bosnia and Herzegovina (monograph), ŽTP Sarajevo, Press and Propaganda Service, Sarajevo 1971.
100 years of the railways of Montenegro (group of authors), Podgorica 2009. ISBN 978-86-7420-054-4 (available on the pages of the Railway Infrastructure of Montenegro)
Construction of a railway line along the Neretva river valley (Ivan Jurić, Ph.D.) Croatian Neretva Collection 1/2009. (pp. 99 – 127), Zagreb, 2009. ISSN 1847-1579, available on the pages of the Society of Neretva and Friends of Neretva Version of the original page archived on 16 January 2014.
Longitudinal profile of the normal gauge line Sarajevo - Ploče, Association of Yugoslav Railways, Institute for Design and Construction Supervision, December 10, 1962.

References
 Sarajevo to Mostar by train

This article is based in part upon a translation of the Croatian-language version as at February 2023.

External links
 
 

Railway lines opened in 1891
Railway lines in Bosnia and Herzegovina
Railway lines in Croatia